9,907 wildfires burned at least  of land in the state of California during 2013. The wildfires injured at least 125 people and killed at least 1. They also caused over $218.15 million (2013 USD) in damage. These included several large, notable wildfires, including the Rim Fire, which became California's 3rd largest wildfire. Another wildfire was ignited by the plane crash of the Asiana Airlines Flight 214 on July 6, 2013, which burned around 1 acre of land.

Fires 
Below is a list of all fires that exceeded  during the 2013 fire season. The list is taken from CAL FIRE's list of large fires.

See also
 List of California wildfires
 Climate change in California

References

External links

 Photos of the fire at weather.com
 Current Fire Information. CAL FIRE (California Department of Forestry and Fire Protection)

 
California, 2013
Wildfires in California by year